Francisco Maldonado da Silva (Jewish name: Eliahu Hanazir; 1592 in Argentina – 23 January 1639, in Peru) was an Argentine marrano physician who was burned at the stake with eleven other Jews in  Lima , Peru, in the largest Auto-da-fé recorded in history. His life has been novelized by Argentinean best selling author Marcos Aguinis in the book Against the Inquisition.

Early life
Francisco was born in San Miguel de Tucumán to a healthy Argentine marrano family of Portuguese Jewish background. He learned about his Jewishness through his father Diego Nuñez da Silva, who was a European Jewish physician.

Medical life
Francisco studied the scriptures and Kabbalah while he was a medical student. After a few years he took a medical posting in Chile, during that time, he decided to assume fully his Jewishness and stop hiding as a Christian converse (marrano converso), regaining his Jewish ancestry by taking circumcision and adopting the name Eliahu Hanazir, also called popularly Eli Nazareno or Elijah the Nazarite. He grew his hair and beard and started signing his name "Heli Nazareo, unworthy servant of God of Israel, alias Silva". He was abducted at night and taken to Lima where he was held in the secret prisons of the Inquisition for six years. During those years, he was confronted 13 times by Catholic theologians who tried to help him find the "True Faith". His astounding knowledge made him valuable even to his enemies. He was held accountable for the heresy of honoring the "Law of Moses", something objectionable to the Holy Inquisition.

His martyrdom
At the time of his death, he had been imprisoned since 1627 and taken to the Colonial Inquisition Court of Lima, Peru. According to a 2010 book, he was imprisoned because he tried to convert his two sisters, who had converted to Catholicism, and as such he was denounced.
The rodent Oecomys franciscorum was named after him and Pope Francis.

Further reading
Bodian, Miriam (2007). Dying in the Law of Moses: Crypto-Jewish Martyrdom in the Iberian World. Indiana University Press. p. 129–152. Retrieved May 7, 2015.
Aguinis, Marcos (2018) Against the Inquisition. Amazon Crossing.

References

Bibliography
http://www.jewishencyclopedia.com/view.jsp?artid=715&letter=S
Aguinis, Marcos. Against the Inquisition. AmazonCrossing, 2018.
Kohut, George Alexander. "The Trial of Fransisco Maldonado De Silva." In Publications of the American Jewish Historical Society Vol. 11 (1903), pp. 163–189.

1639 deaths
Argentine Sephardi Jews
Executed Chilean people
17th-century Chilean people
Chilean Sephardi Jews
Conversos
Victims of the Inquisition
Victims of antisemitic violence
17th-century executions by Spain
People executed by the Spanish Inquisition
People executed for heresy
Jewish martyrs
Argentine people of Portuguese-Jewish descent
Executed Argentine people
1592 births
People executed by Spain by burning
People executed for refusing to convert to Christianity
People from San Miguel de Tucumán